John Anthony Reder (September 24, 1909 – April 12, 1990) was a Polish-American sportsman who, during the 1930s, played soccer with the Fall River Marksmen and the New Bedford Whalers and baseball for the Boston Red Sox. In soccer, he played as a goalkeeper and won three American Soccer League titles and two National Challenge Cup titles. In baseball, he played as a first baseman for the Boston Red Sox, and was voted Most Valuable Player of the New York–Penn League while playing for the Williamsport Grays. Together with Moe Drabowsky, Nap Kloza and Henry Peploski, Reder is one of only four Major League Baseball players to be born in Poland.

Soccer career

Early years
Born in Lublin, Poland, Reder emigrated to the United States with his family as a youth and settled in Fall River, Massachusetts. Reder initially played as a goalkeeper for several local Fall River amateur teams, including Champion Niagara and Walsh Chevrolet. He helped the latter team reach the quarter-finals of the 1929 National Challenge Cup where they eventually lost 5–1 to Bethlehem Steel. Despite letting in five goals, Reder was noted for his performance.

Fall River Marksmen
As a result of his exploits with Walsh Chevrolet, Reder signed with the Fall River Marksmen in 1929. Together with a team that included Billy Gonsalves, Bert Patenaude, Werner Nilsen and Alex McNab, Reder helped the Marksmen win American Soccer League titles in both the spring and fall seasons. He also helped them win the National Challenge Cup in both 1930 and 1931. In the 1930 final, the Marksmen defeated Cleveland Bruell Insurance 9–3 on aggregate in a two-leg final and Reder kept goal in both games. On May 30, 1930 he also played for the Marksmen in a 3–2 defeat against a touring Rangers.

In 1931 when Sam Mark relocated and merged the Marksmen franchise twice, Reder followed the team on both occasions. They first moved to New York City, where they merged with New York Soccer Club and became the New York Yankees. However, before the merger was finalized, the Marksmen had entered the National Challenge Cup. After the move, the new club was unable to re-register for the competition, so they continued to play in the Challenge Cup as the Fall River Marksmen. Reder played in all three games when they beat the Chicago Bricklayers in a final played as a three-game series. At the same time they competed in the Spring 1931 American Soccer League season as the New York Yankees, finishing in third place. In the summer of 1931, Reder also played for a Yankees team featuring Billy Gonsalves, Bert Patenaude and George Moorhouse that twice played Celtic in friendlies. On May 30 at Fenway Park the Yankees won 4–3. However, on June 28 at Yankee Stadium, Celtic won the second game 4–1. For the Fall 1931 season the Yankees moved to New Bedford, Massachusetts where they merged with Fall River F.C. to become the New Bedford Whalers. While playing for the Whalers, Reder won a third ASL title.

Baseball
Before embarking on a career as a soccer goalkeeper, Reder had played as a first baseman for his high school baseball team. With the decline of the American Soccer League, he then switched back to baseball and in 1932 played 17 games for the Boston Red Sox. After making his debut on April 16, he played ten games at first base, one at third, and six as a pinch-hitter. He had a record of 5 hits, 4 runs, 1 double, 3 RBI, 6 walks and 6 strikeouts and played his last game for the Red Sox on June 12. Reder subsequently played for the Hazleton Mountaineers, Reading Red Sox, and Williamsport Grays in the New York–Penn League and for the Syracuse Chiefs of the International League before ending his baseball career at the age of 28. In 1935, while playing for the Grays, he was voted Most Valuable Player in the New York–Penn League.

Later years
Reder subsequently worked as an engineer and served in the United States Navy during World War II, before returning to Fall River, Massachusetts where he died in 1990 from arteriosclerotic heart disease. He was buried in St. Patrick's Cemetery, Fall River.

Honors

Soccer

Fall River Marksmen

American Soccer League
Winners (2):  Spring 1930, Fall 1930
National Challenge Cup
Winners (2): 1930, 1931

New Bedford Whalers

American Soccer League
Winners (1):  Fall 1931

Baseball

Williamsport Grays

New York–Penn League
Most Valuable Player (1935)

Notes

References

External links

1909 births
1990 deaths
Boston Red Sox players
Hazleton Mountaineers players
Reading Red Sox players
Williamsport Grays players
Syracuse Chiefs players
Major League Baseball first basemen
Major League Baseball players from Poland
Sportspeople from Fall River, Massachusetts
American people of Polish descent
Polish footballers
American soccer players
American Soccer League (1921–1933) players
Fall River Marksmen players
New York Yankees (soccer) players
New Bedford Whalers players
United States Navy personnel of World War II
Sportspeople from Lublin
People from Lublin Governorate
Congress Poland emigrants to the United States
Association football goalkeepers
Polish baseball players